The following is a list of notable deaths in March 2017.

Entries for each day are listed alphabetically by surname. A typical entry lists information in the following sequence:
 Name, age, country of citizenship at birth, subsequent country of citizenship (if applicable), reason for notability, cause of death (if known), and reference.

March 2017

1
P. J. Bradley, 76, Northern Irish politician, MLA (1998–2011).
Tania Dalton, 45, New Zealand netball player (national team), brain aneurysm.
Dai Morgan Evans, 73, British archaeologist, cancer.
Paula Fox, 93, American writer (The Slave Dancer, Desperate Characters).
Pierre Guénin, 90, French journalist, magazine publisher and gay rights activist.
John Hampshire, 76, English cricketer (Yorkshire, national team).
Raajesh Johri, 64, Indian singer-songwriter, cardiac arrest.
Hiroshi Kamayatsu, 78, Japanese singer and guitarist (The Spiders), pancreatic cancer.
Richard Karron, 82, American actor (The Flintstones in Viva Rock Vegas, Ready to Rumble, History of the World, Part I).
Shiv K. Kumar, 95, Indian English poet, playwright, novelist, and short story writer.
Yasuyuki Kuwahara, 74, Japanese footballer, Olympic bronze medalist (1968), pneumonia.
Johannes Lahti, 64, Finnish Olympic decathlete (1976, 1980).
Taarak Mehta, 87, Indian playwright and humorist.
Gustav Metzger, 90, German-born stateless auto-destructive artist.
Alicia Morel, 95, Chilean author.
Pamela Neville-Sington, 57, American literary biographer, pancreatic cancer.
Shirley Palesh, 87, American baseball player (AAGPBL).
Michael M. Ryan, 87, American actor (Another World, Remo Williams: The Adventure Begins, Tootsie).
Jins Shamsuddin, 81, Malaysian actor (Bidasari), director and politician, member of the Dewan Negara (2004–2008), choked.
Alejandra Soler, 103, Spanish activist and school teacher.
Tomaso Staiti di Cuddia delle Chiuse, 84, Italian politician and journalist.
Vladimir Tadej, 91, Croatian filmmaker.
Joseph Vũ Duy Thống, 64, Vietnamese Roman Catholic prelate, Bishop of Phan Thiết (since 2009).
Ioannis Tsintsaris, 55, Greek Olympic weightlifter.

2
Usayd al-Adani, Yemeni Al-Qaeda leader, airstrike.
Jerry Baker, 85, American author.
Tarcisio Catanese, 49, Italian football player and manager, heart attack.
Édouard Close, 87, Belgian politician, Burgemeester of Liège (1976–1991).
Tommy Gemmell, 73, Scottish football player (Celtic, Dundee, national team) and manager.
Simon Hobday, 76, South African golfer.
Andrés Ocaña, 62, Spanish politician, Mayor of Córdoba (2009–2011).
Wally Pikal, 90, American musician.
David Rubinger, 92, Austrian-born Israeli photographer.
Howard Schmidt, 67, American cybersecurity advisor, cancer.
John D. Schneider, 80, American state legislator and attorney, member of the Missouri Senate (1971–2002).
Mohamed Tahar, 36–37, Yemeni Guantanamo Bay detention camp prisoner, airstrike.

3
Steve Adams, 57, English footballer (Boston United).
A. J. Baker, 94, Australian philosopher.
Míriam Colón, 80, Puerto Rican-American actress (Scarface, Goal!, All the Pretty Horses), pulmonary infection.
Bernardo Cortés, 83, Spanish humorist, street singer-songwriter and writer.
Bramwell Cook, 81, New Zealand gastroenterologist.
Jim Fuller, 69, American guitarist (The Surfaris).
Dame Anne Griffiths, 84, British librarian and archivist.
Nathan George, 80, American actor (Klute. One Flew Over the Cuckoo's Nest, Short Eyes).
Frances Hargreaves, 62, South African-born Australian actress (Number 96).
Raymond Kopa, 85, French footballer (Real Madrid, national team).
Misha Mengelberg, 81, Ukrainian-born Dutch jazz pianist and composer.
Cyprian Ojwang Omollo, Kenyan politician, MP (2007–2013).
Tommy Page, 46, American singer-songwriter ("I'll Be Your Everything") and music industry executive (Reprise Records, Billboard), suicide.
Mary Parry, 87, British figure skater, European championship bronze medalist (1960).
Jack Petoskey, 95, American football player and coach.
René Préval, 74, Haitian politician, Prime Minister (1991), President (1996–2001, 2006–2011).
Henriette Rasmussen, 66, Greenlandic Inuit educator, women's right activist and politician.
Lyle Ritz, 87, American bassist and ukulelist.
Joe Rogers, 97, American businessman, co-founder of Waffle House.
Stephen Ross, 73, American economist.
Aquinas Ryan, 84, Canadian politician, leader of the New Democratic Party of Prince Edward Island (1972–1979).
Danny Spooner, 80, English folk singer.
Anne Kristin Sydnes, 60, Norwegian politician, Minister of International Development (2000–2001), cancer.
Gordon Thomas, 84, Welsh investigative journalist and author.
Thor Tjøntveit, 80, Norwegian aviator.

4
Jean-Christophe Averty, 88, French television and radio director.
Roy Blake, Sr., 88, American politician. 
Bonnie Burnard, 72, Canadian novelist (A Good House).
Valerie Carter, 64, American singer-songwriter (Howdy Moon, Just a Stone's Throw Away), heart attack.
Mahlon E. Doyle, 92, American cryptologist.
Edi Fitzroy, 62, Jamaican reggae singer.
Roger Hau'ofa, 73, Tongan-born Papua New Guinean radio broadcaster, kidney failure.
John Holliman, 72, British Anglican priest, Archdeacon of the Army (1996-1999).
Lawrence Holofcener, 91, American-British sculptor.
Irena Homola-Skąpska, 88, Polish historian.
Stefan Ingvarsson, 70, Swedish Olympic racewalker.
Takashi Inoue, 56, Japanese actor, cancer.
Eugene N. Kozloff, 96, American marine biologist and botanist.
Péter Kozma, 57, Hungarian politician and MP.
Bob Lee, 81, American football player (Boston Patriots).
Helen M. Marshall, 87, American politician, Borough President of Queens (2002–2013), member of the New York State Assembly (1983–1991).
Giovanni Palamara, 78, Italian politician, Mayor of Reggio Calabria (1984–1985).
Thomas Collier Platt Jr., 91, American jurist, U.S. District Court for the Eastern District of New York (since 1974).
Edna Rose Ritchings, 92, Canadian-American religious leader (International Peace Mission movement).
Margaret Roberts, 79–80, South African herbalist.
Syed Shahabuddin, 82, Indian diplomat and politician, MP (1979–1996).
Thomas Starzl, 90, American physician and medical researcher.
Lazar Stojanović, 73, Serbian film director and activist.
Alberto Villalta, 69, Salvadoran Olympic footballer (1968).
Clayton Yeutter, 86, American politician, Trade Representative (1985–1989) and Secretary of Agriculture (1989–1991), colorectal cancer.

5
Sydney Ball, 83, Australian painter.
Anthony Beilenson, 84, American politician, member of the U.S. House of Representatives from California's 23rd and 24th congressional districts (1977–1997), heart attack.
Gérard Corboud, 91, Swiss art collector and philanthropist.
Burke Day, 62, American politician, member of Georgia House of Representatives (1995–2011).
Joseph Charles Doumba, 81, Cameroonian politician.
Antal Hajba, 79, Hungarian Olympic sprint canoeist (1964).
Gladys Hansen, 91, American librarian, archivist and author.
Ivar J. Hauge, 80, Norwegian politician.
Douglas Henry, 90, American politician, Tennessee State Senator (1971–2014).
Dave Hunt, 74, American comic book artist (Legion of Super-Heroes, Supergirl, Transformers), cancer.
Florence S. Jacobsen, 103, American Mormon leader and missionary.
Octave Levenspiel, 90, American chemical engineer.
Jay Lynch, 72, American underground comics artist, writer and editor (Bijou Funnies, Bazooka Joe), complications from lung cancer.
Leonard Manasseh, 100, British architect.
Kurt Moll, 78, German opera singer.
Theodor Anton Neagu, 84, Romanian paleontologist.
Raymond Paternoster, 65, American criminologist.
Vince, 4, Dutch-born rhinoceros, shot.
Fred Weintraub, 88, American club owner (The Bitter End), film and television producer (Enter the Dragon).
Zhuang Yan, 99, Chinese diplomat, Ambassador to Bangladesh (1976–1979), Iran (1980–1982), and Greece (1983–1985).

6
Ritchie Adams, 78, American songwriter ("Tossin' and Turnin'", "The Tra La La Song (One Banana, Two Banana)", "After the Lovin'") and singer.
Bassel al-Araj, 31, Palestinian activist and pharmacist, shot.
Joachim Baxla, 62, Indian politician, MP (1996–2009), cancer.
David Campagna, 70, American actor and stunt double.
Maneck Dalal, 98, Indian executive (Air India).
Rudolf Deng Majak, 76, South Sudanese Roman Catholic prelate, Bishop of Wau (since 1995).
Lars Diedricson, 55, Swedish singer (Snowstorm), songwriter ("Take Me to Your Heaven") and winner of the Eurovision Song Contest 1999.
Jesús Silva-Herzog Flores, 81, Mexican economist and politician.
Clyde Foster, 85, American scientist and mathematician.
Bill Hougland, 86, American basketball player (Phillips 66ers) and Olympic champion (1952, 1956).
T. William Lambe, 96, American civil engineer.
Mickey Marvin, 61, American football player (Oakland Raiders), amyotrophic lateral sclerosis.
Jehoash Mayanja Nkangi, 85, Ugandan politician, Katikkiro of Buganda (1964–1966, 1993–1994), Minister of Education (1986–1989), Finance (1989–1998) and Justice (1998–2002).
James Michael Moynihan, 84, American Roman Catholic prelate, Bishop of Syracuse (1995–2009).
Robert Osborne, 84, American film historian and television host (Turner Classic Movies).
Marek Ostrowski, 57, Polish footballer (Pogoń Szczecin).
Eddy Pauwels, 81, Belgian racing cyclist.
Bernt Petersen, 80, Danish furniture designer.
Rabi Ray, 90, Indian politician, Speaker of the Lok Sabha (1989–1991).
Shirley Childress Saxton, 69, American sign language interpreter, complications from West Nile virus.
Dudley Storey, 77, New Zealand rower, Olympic champion (1968) and silver medalist (1972).
Geoffrey Wainwright, 79, British archaeologist.
Alberto Zedda, 89, Italian conductor and musicologist.

7
Yoshiyuki Arai, 82, Japanese politician, lung cancer.
Kamran Aziz, 85, Turkish Cypriot pianist, composer and pharmacist, pulmonary complications.
Ron Bass, 68, American professional wrestler (CWA, CWF, WWF), complications from surgery.
Klaus Bechgaard, 72, Danish chemist.
Kalika Prasad Bhattacharya, 47, Indian folk singer, traffic collision.
Slavko Brezoski, 94, Macedonian architect.
Gina Calleja, 88, British-born Canadian author.
Edmond La Beaume Cherbonnier, 99, American theologian.
Henning Kramer Dahl, 54, Norwegian poet, translator, essayist and recording artist.
Hans Georg Dehmelt, 94, German-born American physicist, laureate of the Nobel Prize in Physics (1989).
Ronald Drever, 85, Scottish physicist.
Peter M. Gruber, 75, Austrian mathematician.
Julian Haines, 73, English bowler.
Yukinori Miyabe, 48, Japanese speed skater, Olympic bronze medalist (1992), cancer.
Tadeusz Rybak, 87, Polish Roman Catholic prelate, Bishop of Legnica (1992–2005).
Robert A. Sengstacke, 73, American photojournalist.
Syed Sajjad Ali Shah, 84, Pakistani jurist, Chief Justice (1994–1997).
Helen Sommers, 84, American politician, member of the Washington House of Representatives (1972–2009).
Lynne Stewart, 77, American defense attorney and convicted criminal, complications from breast cancer and multiple strokes.
Francis Thorne, 94, American composer.
Juan Carlos Touriño, 72, Spanish footballer (Real Madrid).
Ellery Williams, 90, American football player (New York Giants).
Xu Zuyao, 95, Chinese materials science expert.

8
Robert Adeyinka Adebayo, 88, Nigerian politician and military officer.
Ezzrett Anderson, 97, American football player (Calgary Stampeders).
Gerard Benderoth, 48, American strongman and police officer, suicide by gunshot.
Sir Clive Bossom, 99, British politician, MP for Leominster (1959–1974).
Lou Duva, 94, American boxing trainer and manager.
Kim Bong-jo, 71, South Korean Olympic swimmer (1964).
Yuri Koroviansky, 49, Ukrainian Olympic volleyball player (1992).
*Lee Yuan-tsu, 93, Taiwanese politician, Vice President (1990–1996).
Michael Maher, 87, Irish hurler (Tipperary).
Danilo Mainardi, 83, Italian ethologist and author.
Dmitry Mezhevich, 76, Russian actor and songwriter.
Margaret Mitchell, 92, Canadian politician and social activist.
Jonathan Moore, 84, American academic and State Department official, Director of the Bureau of Refugee Programs (1987–1989).
Jonathan Moore, 47, American rapper, kidney failure.
Joseph Nicolosi, 70, American clinical psychologist, influenza complications.
George Andrew Olah, 89, Hungarian-born American chemist, Nobel Prize laureate (1994).
Jack Purtell, 95, Australian jockey.
Jonathan Strasser, 70, American violinist and conductor (Fame).
Dave Valentin, 64, American jazz flautist, Parkinson's disease.

9
Mick Adams, 65, English rugby league player (Widnes Vikings).
Kasugafuji Akihiro, 51, Japanese sumo wrestler.
Ann Beach, 78, British actress (Fresh Fields, Notting Hill).
Bobby Byrne, 85, American cinematographer (Smokey and the Bandit, Bull Durham, Mad About You).
Anthony Delhalle, 35, French motorcycle racer, fall during test ride.
Jane Freeman, 81, Welsh actress (Last of the Summer Wine), lung cancer.
Bill Hands, 76, American baseball player (Chicago Cubs).
Barbara Helsingius, 79, Finnish singer, poet and Olympic fencer (1960).
Sir Howard Hodgkin, 84, British painter and printmaker.
Keith Holliday, 82, British rugby league player (Wakefield Trinity).
Marian Jankowski, 85, Polish Olympic weightlifter.
Peter Karoff, 79, American philanthropist.
Hla Myint, 97, Burmese economist.
Grethe Lovsø Nielsen, 90, Danish Olympic athlete (1948).
Samuel Ogbemudia, 84, Nigerian politician, Governor of Mid-Western State (1967–1975).
Aldo Quaglio, 85, French rugby union player.
Neila Sathyalingam, 78, Sri Lankan-born Singaporean dancer and choreographer.
Jacqueline Naze Tjøtta, 81, Norwegian mathematician.

10
Bob Altman, 85, American comedian, leukemia.
Dave Brazil, 80, American football coach (New York Giants).
Absalón Castellanos Domínguez, 93, Mexican politician, Governor of Chiapas (1982–1988).
Sir Nigel Cecil, 91, British Royal Navy officer, Lieutenant Governor of the Isle of Man (1980–1985).
Mari Evans, 93, American poet.
Carol Field, 76, American cookbook author, complications from a stroke.
John Forgeham, 75, British actor (The Italian Job, Sheena, Footballers' Wives), complications from a fall.
Christopher Gray, 66, American journalist and architectural historian.
Tony Haygarth, 72, English actor (Chicken Run, Emmerdale, Dracula), Alzheimer's disease.
Glyn Tegai Hughes, 94, Welsh academic and politician.
Ben Jobe, 84, American college basketball coach (Southern, South Carolina State, Alabama A&M).
Charles Wycliffe Joiner, 101, American jurist, member of the District Court for the Eastern District of Michigan (since 1972).
Gido Kokars, 95, Latvian conductor.
Kafougouna Koné, 73, Malian politician.
Bill Leak, 61, Australian editorial cartoonist, heart attack.
Alain Levoyer, 76, French politician.
Yngve Lundh, 92, Swedish Olympic racing cyclist (1952).
Maurice Lusien, 90, French Olympic swimmer (1948, 1952).
Alu Mendonca, 84, Kenyan Olympic hockey player.
Roy Mason, 83, British figure skater, European championship bronze medalist (1960).
Nikolay Minev, 85, Bulgarian chess player.
John Minson, 89, Australian radio personality.
Aníbal Ruiz, 74, Uruguayan football manager (Paraguay), heart attack.
Joni Sledge, 60, American singer (Sister Sledge).
John Surtees, 83, British motorcycle racer, world champion (1956, 1958, 1959, 1960) and Formula One driver, world champion (1964), respiratory failure.
Anna Tramontano, 59, Italian computational biologist.
Richard Wagamese, 61, Canadian author (Medicine Walk).
Robert James Waller, 77, American writer (The Bridges of Madison County), multiple myeloma.

11
Tommy Asher, 80, English footballer (Notts County F.C.).
Lloyd Conover, 93, American scientist, inventor of tetracycline, heart failure.
Kitty Courbois, 79, Dutch actress (Leedvermaak), brain haemorrhage.
Penelope Reed Doob, 73, American academic, Parkinson's disease.
Jean-Claude Étienne, 75, French politician.
Garrett G. Fagan, 54, Irish-born American historian, pancreatic cancer.
Evan Johns, 60, American guitarist (The LeRoi Brothers), complications from surgery.
András Kovács, 91, Hungarian filmmaker.
Paul Mitchell, 96, American football player (Los Angeles Dons).
Ángel Parra, 73, Chilean singer and songwriter, lung cancer.
Winifred Piesse, 93, Australian politician.
Mohamed Mijarul Quayes, 56, Bangladeshi diplomat, Ambassador to the United Kingdom (2012–2014) and Brazil (since 2014), multiple organ failure.
Cheyyar Ravi, 54, Indian film and television director, cardiac arrest.
*Tsui Hsiao-ping, 94, Taiwanese radio director.
Don Warden, 87, American country musician and manager (Dolly Parton).
Manfred Weiß, 72, German politician, Justice Minister of Bavaria (1999–2003).

12
Pamela Sue Anderson, 61, British philosopher, cancer.
Murray Ball, 78, New Zealand cartoonist (Footrot Flats).
Luigi Barbarito, 94, Italian Roman Catholic prelate, Apostolic Nuncio (1969–1997).
Anatoly Chernyaev, 95, Russian historian and writer.
Horst Ehmke, 90, German politician, Minister of Justice (1969).
Christian Feurstein, 58, Austrian abbot.
Jacques Fihey, 85, French Roman Catholic prelate, Bishop of Coutances and Avranches (1989–2006).
Ray Hassall, 74, English politician, Lord Mayor of Birmingham (2015–2016).
Sir Probyn Inniss, 80, Saint Kitts and Nevis lawyer, Governor of Saint Christopher and Nevis (1975–1981).
Stavro Jabra, 70, Lebanese cartoonist.
Sverre Bergh Johansen, 77, Norwegian diplomat, Ambassador to China (1994–1999).
Petra Kandarr, 66, German sprinter, European champion (1969).
Sture Korpi, 77, Swedish politician, Secretary of state (1982–1991).
Patrick Nève, 67, Belgian racing driver (Formula One).
Joann Osterud, 71, American stunt pilot.
Bhuma Nagi Reddy, 53, Indian politician, heart attack.
Harvey Smith, 80, Canadian politician, Winnipeg City Council (1980–1986, 1998–2014), Manitoba Legislative Assembly (1986–1988).
Dave Taylor, 76, English footballer (Yeovil Town).

13
John Andariese, 78, American broadcaster (New York Knicks).
Adib Boroumand, 92, Iranian poet and politician, Head of Leadership Council of National Front of Iran (since 2000).
Eamonn Casey, 89, Irish Roman Catholic prelate, Bishop of Galway and Kilmacduagh (1976–1992).
John Crutcher, 100, American politician, Lieutenant Governor of Kansas (1965–1969).
Henri Cueco, 88, French painter and author (Conversations with My Gardener).
Danehill Dancer, 24, Irish-bred British-trained thoroughbred racehorse and sire, euthanized. (death announced on this date)
Kika de la Garza, 89, American politician, member of the U.S. House of Representatives from Texas's 15th congressional district (1965–1997), kidney failure.
Morton Deutsch, 97, American social psychologist.
Diphan, 45, Indian film director, kidney problems.
Vincent Foy, 101, Canadian Roman Catholic cleric and theologian.
Osamu Fujimura, 89, Japanese phonetician.
Chris Greetham, 80, British cricketer (Somerset).
Morihiro Hashimoto, 40, Japanese darts player, brain haemorrhage.
André Jagendorf, 90, American plant biologist.
Sarah Jiménez, 90, Mexican artist.
Maxx Kidd, 75, American music producer.
Tommy LiPuma, 80, American music producer.
Hiroto Muraoka, 85, Japanese footballer.
Richard, 6th Prince of Sayn-Wittgenstein-Berleburg, 82, German royal, head of the House of Sayn-Wittgenstein-Berleburg.
Amy Krouse Rosenthal, 51, American author, ovarian cancer.
Richard H. Solomon, 79, American political aide and diplomat, Ambassador to the Philippines (1992–1993), brain cancer.
Marvin Speight, 95, American basketball coach (Arkansas State).
Dennis Stamp, 68, American professional wrestler (NWA, AWA), cancer.
Vida Hajebi Tabrizi, 81, Iranian political activist and writer.
Alejandro Végh Villegas, 88, Uruguayan politician and diplomat.
Ed Whitlock, 86, British-born Canadian long distance runner, prostate cancer.

14
Rebecca Bace, 61, American computer scientist, heart attack.
Andrzej Biegalski, 64, Polish Olympic boxer (1976).
Paul Bowles, 59, English footballer (Crewe Alexandra, Port Vale, Stockport County).
Barbara Boxall, 84, English women's magazine editor.
Lillie Mae Bradford, 88, American civil rights activist.
Dara Fitzpatrick, 45, Irish Coast Guard helicopter pilot, helicopter crash.
Thomas H. Friedkin, 81, American businessman (Gulf States Toyota).
Donald Gilchrist, 95, Canadian figure skater.
Jack H. Harris, 98, American film producer (The Blob).
Arleene Johnson, 93, Canadian baseball player (AAGPBL).
Nitin Kapoor, 58, Indian film producer, suicide.
Luigi Mannelli, 78, Italian water polo player, Olympic champion (1960).
Jim McAnearney, 81, Scottish football player (Plymouth Argyle) and manager (Rotherham United).
Yelena Naimushina, 52, Russian gymnast, Olympic champion (1980).
Luigi Pascale, 93, Italian aircraft designer (Partenavia P.68).
Royal Robbins, 82, American rock climber.
André Tosel, 75, French Marxist philosopher.
Rodrigo Valdéz, 70, Colombian boxer, WBC middleweight champion, heart attack.
John Van de Kamp, 81, American politician and attorney, Los Angeles County District Attorney (1975–1981), California Attorney General (1983–1991).
Peter Vargo, 75, Austrian footballer 
Tsunehiko Watase, 72, Japanese actor (The Incident).
John Wheatcroft, 91, American writer and teacher.

15
Antero de Abreu, 90, Angolan lawyer, writer and diplomat.
Bảo Thắng, 72, Vietnamese royal, head of the Nguyễn dynasty (since 2007).
Fritz Briel, 82, German sprint canoeist, world champion (1958, 1963), Olympic silver medalist (1956).
Bob Bruce, 83, American baseball player (Detroit Tigers, Houston Astros, Atlanta Braves).
Stephen Cosh, 97, Scottish cricketer.
Imre Dimény, 94, Hungarian agrarian engineer and politician, Minister of Agriculture and Food (1967–1975).
Robert G. Dunn, 94, American politician.
Job Durupt, 86, French politician, member of the National Assembly (1981–1988), mayor of Tomblaine (1971–2001).
Denis Éthier, 90, Canadian politician.
Phil Garland, 75, New Zealand folk musician.
Russ Goetz, 86, American baseball umpire (American League).
Lucky Gordon, 85, Jamaican jazz singer, involved in the Profumo affair.
Valentine Joseph, 88, Sri Lankan mathematician.
Laurent Laplante, 83, Canadian journalist, pancreatic cancer.
Alberto Longarella, 93, Argentine Olympic wrestler (1948, 1952).
Fernand Martinaux, 88, French Olympic swimmer.
Michael Maule, 95, South African-born American ballet dancer and instructor.
Wojciech Młynarski, 75, Polish poet, singer and songwriter.
Enrique Morea, 92, Argentine tennis player, French Open (1950) and Pan Am Games (1951) champion.
Jackie Pung, 95, American golfer.
*Sok An, 66, Cambodian politician, Deputy Prime Minister (since 2004) and MP (since 1993).
Dave Stallworth, 75, American basketball player (New York Knicks, Baltimore/Capital Bullets).
Bill Walsh, 55, American author and newspaper editor (The Washington Post), complications from bile duct cancer.
Chris Williams, 36, American basketball player (Virginia Cavaliers, Sydney Kings), blood clots.

16
Tony Barrow, 45, English rugby league player (Swinton Lions), cancer.
Hans Brattrud, 83, Norwegian furniture designer.
George Braziller, 101, American literary publisher.
James Cotton, 81, American blues harmonica player ("Hard Again"), pneumonia.
K. R. Indira Devi, 65, Indian actress, cardiac arrest.
Aleksander Einseln, 85, Estonian military officer, Commander of the Estonian Defence Forces (1993–1995).
Kerry Hooper, 74, Australian cricketer.
Arne Høivik, 85, Norwegian footballer (Eik-Tønsberg).
Roberta Knie, 79, American operatic soprano.
Torgny Lindgren, 78, Swedish writer, member of the Swedish Academy (since 1991).
Rodger Maus, 84, American art director (M*A*S*H, Victor/Victoria, The Time Tunnel).
Hasyim Muzadi, 72, Indonesian Islamic scholar and cleric, Chairman of Nahdlatul Ulama (1999–2010).
Henry Richmond, 81, British Anglican prelate, Bishop of Repton (1986–1998).
Lewis Rowland, 91, American neurologist, stroke.
William Sanders, 74, American statistician.
Youcef Touati, 27, French-born Algerian football player (Red Star), traffic collision.
Skip Williamson, 72, American underground comix cartoonist (Snappy Sammy Smoot), complications of organ failure.

17
Robert Day, 94, British television and film director (The Green Man, First Man into Space, The Rebel).
Auntie Fee, 59, American Internet personality and actress (Barbershop: The Next Cut), heart attack.
José Luis Garzón, 70, Spanish Olympic footballer (1968).
Hugh Hardy, 84, American architect.
Maureen Haughey, 91, Irish public figure.
John Herbers, 93, American journalist and author.
Peter Kwong, 76, Taiwanese-American sociologist.
Léonard Legault, 82, Canadian diplomat, Ambassador to the Holy See (1993–1997).
George Lewith, 67, British medical researcher.
Lawrence Montaigne, 86, American actor (The Great Escape, Star Trek, Escape to Witch Mountain).
Norbert Sander, 74, American long-distance runner, winner of the New York City Marathon (1974).
Paul Sicula, 78, American politician.
Laurynas Stankevičius, 81, Lithuanian politician, Prime Minister (1996).
Jan Szpunar, 64, Polish Olympic biathlete.
Inomjon Usmonxo‘jayev, 86, Soviet politician, First Secretary of the Communist Party of Uzbekistan (1983–1988).
Sir Derek Walcott, 87, Saint Lucian poet and playwright, Nobel Prize laureate (1992).

18
Tom Amberry, 94, American podiatrist.
Chuck Berry, 90, American Hall of Fame guitarist, singer and songwriter ("Johnny B. Goode", "Maybellene", "Roll Over Beethoven"), heart attack.
George E. Bria, 101, American journalist (Associated Press).
Trisha Brown, 80, American choreographer and dancer.
Eugene Crum Foshee, 79, American politician.
Sergei Gimayev, 62, Russian ice hockey player (CSKA Moscow) and television sports presenter.
Gerry Gimelstob, 66, American basketball coach (George Washington Colonials), leukemia.
Don Hunstein, 88, American photographer.
Maureen Lines, 79, British-born Pakistani social worker and environmentalist.
Joe Mafela, 75, South African actor (Zulu, Shout at the Devil, Escape from Angola), traffic collision.
J. Donald Monan, 92, American academic administrator, President of Boston College (1972–1996).
Tony Russel, 91, American actor (Behind the Mask of Zorro, Wild, Wild Planet, War of the Planets).
Ashwin Sundar, 31, Indian racing driver, car fire.
Alfred Tibor, 97, Hungarian-born American sculptor and Holocaust survivor.
Miloslav Vlk, 84, Czech Roman Catholic cardinal, Archbishop of Prague (1991–2010), cancer.
Bernie Wrightson, 68, American illustrator and comic book artist (House of Mystery, Batman, Swamp Thing), brain cancer.

19
Zubaida Gulshan Ara, 74, Bangladeshi writer, recipient of the Ekushey Padak (1995).
Jimmy Breslin, 88, American journalist and author (New York Daily News, Newsday), recipient of the Pulitzer Prize (1986), complications from pneumonia.
Mary Maples Dunn, 85, American historian.
Ivan Grubišić, 80, Croatian Roman Catholic priest, sociologist, and MP (2011–2015).
Billy Hails, 82, English football player and manager (Peterborough United).
Audrey Kissel, 91, American baseball player (Minneapolis Millerettes).
*Li Li-Hua, 92, Hong Kong actress.
Ryan McBride, 27, Irish footballer (Derry City).
John Jeremiah McRaith, 82, American Roman Catholic prelate, Bishop of Owensboro (1982–2009).
Len Mitzel, 71, Canadian politician, MLA (2004–2012).
Chinu Modi, 78, Indian poet, multiple organ failure.
Pyarimohan Mohapatra, 77, Indian politician, MP (2010–2016).
Tomiko Okazaki, 73, Japanese politician.
Roger Pingeon, 76, French racing cyclist, Tour de France winner (1967), heart attack.
John Rogan, 78, Irish actor (The Bill).
Eric Shanes, 72, English painter and art historian.
Robin Sibson, 72, British mathematician, vice-chancellor of the University of Kent, chief executive of the Higher Education Statistics Agency.
Pauline Smith, 83, British painter and provocateur.
Ian Stewart, 87, British racing driver.
Ken Still, 82, American professional golfer.
Maurice Xiberras, 80, Gibraltarian politician.

20
Herbert Barrie, 89, British paediatrician.
Bagrat de Bagration y de Baviera, 68, Spanish royal, member of the Bagrationi dynasty.
Daniel G. Bobrow, 81, American computer scientist.
John Paul Cain, 81, American golfer.
Andy Coan, 59, American swimmer, liver cancer.
Terence Finlay, 79, Canadian Anglican prelate, Metropolitan of Ontario and Archbishop of Toronto (2000–2004).
Louis Frémaux, 95, French conductor.
John Giheno, 68, Papua New Guinea politician.
Lucio Grotone, 88, Brazilian Olympic boxer.
Carlos Hermosillo Arteaga, 39, Mexican politician (PRI), Deputy (2015-2018), and public servant, traffic collision.
Shuntaro Hida, 100, Japanese physician, complications from pneumonia.
Buck Hill, 90, American jazz saxophonist.
Joyce Holmberg, 86, American politician and educator.
Betty Kennedy, 91, Canadian broadcaster (CFRB), Senator (2000–2001) and TV panelist (Front Page Challenge).
David Lawrence, 58, American basketball player (McNeese State, Pallacanestro Trieste, Saski Baskonia).
Edward Joseph McManus, 97, American politician and jurist, Lieutenant Governor of Iowa (1959–1961), member of the District Court for N.D. Iowa (since 1962), longest-serving federal judge.
Leticia Ramos-Shahani, 87, Filipino politician, member of the Senate (1987–1998) and President pro tempore (1993–1996), complications from colon cancer and pneumonia.
Poddutoori Ganga Reddy, 83, Indian politician, MP (1967–1970, 1971–1977).
Chandler Robbins, 98, American ornithologist.
David Rockefeller, 101, American banker (Chase Manhattan), globalist (Trilateral Commission) and philanthropist (Rockefeller Brothers Fund), heart failure.
Robert B. Silvers, 87, American editor (New York Review of Books).
Edgar Smith, 83, American murderer.
Tony Terran, 90, American trumpeter and session musician.
George Weinberg, 87, American psychologist, coined the term "homophobia", cancer.
Ed Wright, 67, American Olympic fencer.

21
Chuck Barris, 87, American television producer, game show creator, host (The Gong Show, The Dating Game), and songwriter ("Palisades Park").
Guy Bisaillon, 77, Canadian politician.
Colin Dexter, 86, English author (Inspector Morse).
Henri Emmanuelli, 71, French politician, President of National Assembly (1993–1994), complications from acute bronchitis.
August Englas, 92, Estonian wrestler, world champion (1953, 1954).
Roy Fisher, 86, British poet and jazz pianist.
Arne Herjuaune, 71, Norwegian Olympic speed skater (1968).
Larry Highbaugh, 67, Canadian football player (Edmonton Eskimos).
Kalevi Häkkinen, 89, Finnish Olympic alpine skier and speed skier (1956).
Jerry Krause, 77, American basketball executive (Chicago Bulls).
Marita Lindahl, 78, Finnish model, Miss World (1957).
Scott McGilvray, 51, American politician, New Hampshire Senator (since 2016).
Martin McGuinness, 66, Northern Irish PIRA commander and politician, deputy First Minister (2007–2017), MLA (1998–2017), MP (1997–2013), complications from amyloidosis.
Ronald Pickvance, 86, English art historian.
Bill Rompkey, 80, Canadian politician, Senator from Newfoundland and Labrador (1995–2011).
József Szécsényi, 85, Hungarian Olympic discus thrower (1960, 1964).
Tayfun Talipoğlu, 55, Turkish journalist and author, heart attack.
Govind Talwalkar, 92, Indian journalist and editor (Maharashtra Times).
Teresia Teaiwa, 48, I-Kiribati-American poet and academic, cancer.
José Zardón, 93, Cuban baseball player (Washington Senators).

22
Marilyn McCord Adams, 73, American philosopher and priest, cancer.
Andy Coogan, 99, Scottish author and World War II veteran.
Ken Currie, 91, Scottish footballer (Heart of Midlothian, Dunfermline Athletic).
John Derrick, 54, Welsh cricketer (Glamorgan), brain tumour.
Dallas Green, 82, American baseball player, manager (Philadelphia Phillies, New York Mets) and executive (Chicago Cubs), kidney failure and pneumonia.
Pete Hamilton, 74, American racecar driver, winner of the 1970 Daytona 500.
Sib Hashian, 67, American drummer (Boston).
Mark Higgins, 53, American baseball player (Cleveland Indians).
Francine Hughes, 69, American film subject (The Burning Bed) and domestic abuse symbol, complications from pneumonia.
Alexandr Kliment, 88, Czech writer, poet and playwright, Charter 77 signatory.
Joanne Kyger, 82, American poet, lung cancer.
Sven-Erik Magnusson, 74, Swedish musician (Sven-Ingvars), prostate cancer.
Tomas Milian, 84, Cuban-born Italian actor (The Big Gundown, Traffic, Amistad), stroke.
Agustí Montal Costa, 82, Spanish economist and businessman, President of FC Barcelona (1969–1977).
Ronnie Moran, 83, English football player and coach (Liverpool).
Piroska Oszoli, 98, Hungarian painter.
Keith Palmer, 48, British police officer, stabbed during 2017 Westminster attack.
Daisuke Satō, 52, Japanese game designer, novelist, and manga writer (Highschool of the Dead), ischemic heart disease.
Helena Štáchová, 72, Czech puppeteer (Spejbl and Hurvínek Theater) and voice actress.
Lembit Ulfsak, 69, Estonian actor (Tangerines), muscular dystrophy.
Christina Vella, 75, American writer and historian.

23
Lola Albright, 92, American actress (Champion, Peter Gunn, Lord Love a Duck).
Ashokamitran, 85, Indian writer.
Mirella Bentivoglio, 94, Italian artist.
Miroslava Breach, 54, Mexican journalist (La Jornada), murdered.
Donald Burgett, 91, American writer and World War II veteran.
John W. Darrah, 78, American jurist, member of the District Court for the Northern District of Illinois (since 2000).
Serge Doubrovsky, 88, French author.
Meir Einstein, 65, Israeli sports broadcaster (Channel 10), muscular dystrophy.
Julio Etchegoyen, 83, Argentine army officer and politician, Governor of Chubut Province (1976–1978) and La Pampa Province (1978–1981).
Lee Farr, 89, American actor (Thundering Jets, Lone Texan, Gunfighters of Abilene).
Nigel Hutchinson, 75, English-born New Zealand producer (Goodbye Pork Pie).
William H. Keeler, 86, American Roman Catholic cardinal, Bishop of Harrisburg (1983–1989), Archbishop of Baltimore (1989–2007).
Arnfinn Lund, 81, Norwegian horse trainer.
Clay Matthews Sr., 88, American football player (San Francisco 49ers).
Denis McGrath, 48, American-Canadian television writer and producer (Continuum, XIII: The Series, Republic of Doyle), cancer.
Nicolas Nieri, 77, Peruvian Olympic footballer (1960).
Mary Owen, 96, Australian feminist and trade unionist.
Ingeborg Rapoport, 104, German pediatrician.
Ian Robinson, 91, Australian politician, member of the House of Representatives for Cowper (1963–1984) and Page (1984–1990).
Sølvi Sogner, 85, Norwegian historian.
Ahmad Taufik, 51, Indonesian journalist, lung cancer.
Alex Tizon, 57, Filipino-born American journalist and author (The Seattle Times), recipient of the Pulitzer Prize (1997).
Cino Tortorella, 89, Italian television presenter (Zecchino d'Oro).
Denis Voronenkov, 45, Russian politician, member of the State Duma (2011–2016), shot.
George Woodman, 85, American artist.

24
Ivan Abadjiev, 85, Bulgarian weightlifter, world championship silver medalist (1957).
J. Allen Adams, 85, American politician and legislator.
Herbert Addo, 66, Ghanaian football coach.
Bartolo Alvarez, 102, Puerto Rican musician.
Piers Dixon, 88, British politician, MP for Truro (1970–1974).
John Doull, 94, American toxicologist.
Rich Fisher, 67, American news anchor (WJBK), esophageal cancer.
Lennox Grafton, 97, Canadian architect.
Hubert Hammerer, 92, Austrian sports shooter, Olympic gold medalist (1960).
Leo Peelen, 48, Dutch track cyclist, Olympic silver medalist (1988).
Jean Rouverol, 100, American actress (It's a Gift) and screenwriter (Autumn Leaves, The Guiding Light).
Pedro Salvatori, 83, Argentine politician, Governor of Neuquén Province (1973, 1987–1991).
Avraham Sharir, 84, Israeli diplomat and politician, Minister of Tourism (1981–1988) and Justice (1986–1988).
Pete Shotton, 75, British washboardist (The Quarrymen) and businessman (Fatty Arbuckle's, Apple Corps), suspected heart attack.
William Kelly Simpson, 89, American Egyptologist.
Wolfgang Solz, 77, German football player and coach (Eintracht Frankfurt, national team).
Keith Sutton, 82, English Anglican prelate, Bishop of Lichfield (1984–2003).
Mary Tortorich, 102, American voice teacher.
Avo Uvezian, 91, Armenian-American jazz pianist and cigar manufacturer.
Gilbert Vallanchon, 75, French Olympic rower.

25
Abu Umar al-Almani, 30–31, German jihadist and ISIL commander, shot.
Ralph Archbold, 75, American actor and impersonator (Benjamin Franklin), complications of heart failure.
Sheila Bond, 90, American actress (Wish You Were Here, The Marrying Kind, Damn Yankees), Tony winner (1953).
Giorgio Capitani, 89, Italian filmmaker (The Ruthless Four).
Louis Desmarais, 94, Canadian politician.
Gary Doak, 71, Canadian ice hockey player (Boston Bruins), cancer.
Jack Faszholz, 89, American baseball player (St. Louis Cardinals).
Louis Feldman, 90, American classical scholar.
František Gaulieder, 66, Slovak politician, MP (1994–1996), suspected suicide by train.
Daniel P. Gordon, 47, American politician, member of the Rhode Island House of Representatives (2011–2013).	
Paula Christine Hammond, 73, British magistrate.
Asbjørn Hansen, 86, Norwegian footballer (Sparta, national team).
Roberta L. Hazard, 82, American Navy rear admiral.
J. Richard Hill, 88, British Navy rear admiral.
Alice Hohlmayer, 92, American baseball player (Kenosha Comets).
Walter Meier, 89, German Olympic athlete.
Christy Mihos, 67, American businessman and politician, pancreatic cancer.
Teodor Oizerman, 102, Ukrainian-born Russian philosopher, heart failure.
Marcelo Pinto Carvalheira, 88, Brazilian Roman Catholic prelate, Bishop of Guarabira (1981–1989), Archbishop of Paraíba (1995–2004).
Miquel Roger i Casamada, 62, Spanish composer and music producer, traffic collision.
Sir Cuthbert Sebastian, 95, St. Kitts and Nevis politician, Governor-General (1996–2013).
Julian Stanczak, 88, Polish-born American Op Art painter.
Dave Steele, 42, American racing driver (IndyCar, NASCAR, ARCA), USAC Silver Crown Champion (2004, 2005), race collision.
María Esther Vázquez, 79, Argentine writer, stroke.
N. K. Viswanathan, 75, Indian film director and cinematographer.
Eric Watson, 91, New Zealand cricketer (Otago) and rugby union coach (Otago, national team).

26
Alessandro Alessandroni, 92, Italian composer and musician.
Audun Bakke, 83, Norwegian journalist.
Darlene Cates, 69, American actress (What's Eating Gilbert Grape).
*Chen Uen, 58, Taiwanese manhua artist, heart attack.
Mai Dantsig, 86, Belarusian artist.
Monty Davidson, 81, Canadian politician.
Jimmy Dotson, 83, American blues musician.
Todd Frohwirth, 54, American baseball player (Baltimore Orioles, Philadelphia Phillies), stomach cancer.
Joe Harris, 89, American illustrator and storyboard artist (Underdog, Trix).
Ernest M. Henley, 92, American physicist.
Marie Jakober, 75, Canadian author.
Vladimir Kazachyonok, 64, Russian football player (Zenit) and manager (Dynamo Saint Petersburg).
Brian Oldfield, 71, American Olympic shot putter (1972).
Věra Špinarová, 65, Czech singer, heart attack.
Philippe d'Ursel, 96, Swiss-born Belgian Olympic alpine skier (1948).
Roger Wilkins, 85, American civil rights activist and journalist (The Crisis), Assistant Attorney General (1966–1969), complications from dementia.

27
Leoncio Afonso, 100, Spanish scientist.
Mizu Ahmed, 63, Bangladeshi actor, heart attack.
Shirley Annan, 76, New Zealand netball player (national team).
Peter Bastian, 73, Danish bassoonist.
Richard Beale, 96, British actor (Doctor Who, Emmerdale, The Bill).
Romolo Bizzotto, 92, Italian football player and manager (Verona, Juventus).
Arthur Blythe, 76, American jazz alto saxophonist and composer, Parkinson's disease.
Chelsea Brown, 74, American-Australian actress (Rowan & Martin's Laugh-In, Number 96), pneumonia.
Jose Antonio N. Carrion, 68, Filipino politician, Governor of Marinduque (2007–2010, 1995–1998).
Zaida Catalán, 36, Swedish lawyer and politician, Chairman of Young Greens of Sweden (2001–2005), shot. (body found on this date)
Leone Cimpellin, 90, Italian cartoonist (Jonny Logan).
Stanley Cohen, 90, American physicist.
Clem Curtis, 76, Trinidadian-born British singer, lung cancer.
Beau Dick, 61, Canadian Kwakwaka'wakw activist and carver, complications from a stroke.
Kaljo Ellik, 68, Estonian politician.
Jean-Michel Guilcher, 102, French ethnologist.
Cherry, Lady Hambro, 83, British journalist and aviator.
John D. Herbert, 86, American attorney, Ohio State Treasurer (1963–1971).
Velik Kapsazov, 81, Bulgarian gymnast, Olympic bronze medalist (1960).
Rainer Kussmaul, 70, German violinist, conductor and concertmaster, Grammy Award winner (2005).
Eduard Mudrik, 77, Ukrainian-born Russian football player (Dynamo Moscow).
Charles Murphy, 56, American investor and hedge fund manager.
Ali H. Nayfeh, 83, Palestinian-born American aerospace engineer.
John A. Newton, 86, British Methodist minister.
Armando Nieto, 85, Peruvian Roman Catholic priest and historian.
Robert Parr, 95, American theoretical chemist.
Sean Roberts, 48, New Zealand cricketer.
Arun Sarma, 85, Indian playwright.
David Storey, 83, English novelist (Saville), screenwriter (This Sporting Life) and playwright (Home), Parkinson's disease and dementia.
Harold Neville Vazeille Temperley, 102, British applied mathematician.
Steve Vaillancourt, 65, American politician, member of the New Hampshire House of Representatives (1996–2014, since 2016).
Elizabeth Wagele, 77, American writer and musician, neuroendocrine cancer.

28
Infanta Alicia, Duchess of Calabria, 99, Austro-Hungarian-born Spanish and Italian noblewoman.
T. R. Andhyarujina, 83, Indian lawyer, Solicitor General (1996–1998).
Jean-Pierre Cave, 65, French politician.
Ronald Hines, 87, British actor (Not in Front of the Children).
Deane R. Hinton, 94, American diplomat and ambassador.
Ahmed Kathrada, 87, South African anti-apartheid activist and politician, MP (1994–1999), complications from cerebral embolism.
Christine Kaufmann, 72, Austrian-born German actress (Town Without Pity, Bagdad Café, The Last Days of Pompeii), leukemia.
Liévin Lerno, 89, Belgian bicycle racer, Olympic champion (1948), world championship silver medalist (1948).
William McPherson, 84, American journalist (The Washington Post) and author, Pulitzer Prize winner (1977), complications from heart failure and pneumonia.
Bill Minor, 94, American journalist.
Gwilym Prys Prys-Davies, Baron Prys-Davies, 93, Welsh lawyer and politician.
Gurdev Singh Badal, 85, Indian politician.
Janine Sutto, 95, French-born Canadian actress (Kamouraska, Congorama, Route 132).
Enn Vetemaa, 80, Estonian writer.

29
Alexei Alexeyevich Abrikosov, 88, Russian-American theoretical physicist, laureate of the Nobel Prize in Physics (2003).
Raudha Athif, 20, Maldivian model, suicide by hanging.
Mireille Cébeillac-Gervasoni, 74, French historian.
John Collias, 98, American Western artist.
Wayne Duke, 88, American collegiate athletic executive, commissioner of the Big Ten Conference (1971–1988).
Valeri Glushakov, 58, Kazakh-born Russian football player (Spartak Moscow, CSKA Moscow) and manager.
Alan Johnston, 63, Irish cricketer.
Steen Miles, 70, American journalist and politician, member of the Georgia State Senate (2005–2007), lung cancer.
João Gilberto Noll, 70, Brazilian writer.
Ernst Ogris, 49, Austrian football player (Hertha BSC) and manager.
Linwood Sexton, 90, American football player (Wichita State Shockers, Los Angeles Dons).
Katherine Smith, 98, American Navajo activist.
Ken Sparks, 73, American football coach and player (Carson–Newman Eagles), prostate cancer.
Bonno Spieker, 81, Dutch politician, member of the House of Representatives (1977–1981, 1981–1994).

30
Thomas Brandis, 81, German violinist and concertmaster.
Richard Bustillo, 75, American martial arts instructor.
Sir John Fretwell, 86, British diplomat, Ambassador to France (1982–1987).
James Hadnot, 59, American football player (Kansas City Chiefs), heart attack.
Paul Hamilton, 75, Nigerian Olympic football player (1968) and manager (national team).
Rosie Hamlin, 71, American singer (Rosie and the Originals).
Donald Harvey, 64, American serial killer, beaten.
Phillip Ko, 67, Hong Kong actor and director.
Nina Lowry, 91, British barrister and judge.
Robert Mahoney, 95, American politician, member of the Michigan House of Representatives (1955–1972).
Alfred C. Marble Jr., 80, American Episcopal prelate, Bishop of Mississippi (1993–2003).
Neelamana Madhavan Nampoothiri, 73, Indian historian and writer.
Hattie Peterson, 86, American baseball player (Rockford Peaches), lung cancer.
Dick Potts, 77, British ecologist.
Alec Ross, 80, Australian tour guide.
Tom Savage, 76, Irish broadcasting executive, chairman of the RTÉ Board (2009–2014).
Mary White, 91, English physician and chairwoman of the Bromsgrove Festival.

31
Halit Akçatepe, 79, Turkish actor.
Rubén Amaro Sr., 81, Mexican baseball player (Philadelphia Phillies, New York Yankees) and coach, World Series champion (1980).
John Arnott, 84, English footballer (Bournemouth, Gillingham).
Abul Kalam Azad, 45, Bangladeshi military officer, injuries sustained in bomb explosion.
Gilbert Baker, 65, American artist and gay activist, creator of the rainbow flag.
Richard Nelson Bolles, 90, American writer (What Color Is Your Parachute?).
William Thaddeus Coleman Jr., 96, American lawyer (Brown v. Board of Education), federal judge and politician, Secretary of Transportation (1975–1977), Alzheimer's disease.
Rupert Cornwell, 71, British journalist (The Independent).
Jerrier A. Haddad, 94, American computer engineer.
Mike Hall, 35, British endurance cyclist, traffic collision.
James Clinkscales Hill, 93, American jurist, member of the District Court for N.D. Georgia (1974–1976), 5th Cir. (1976–1981), and 11th Cir. (since 1981).
Radley Metzger, 88, American pornographic filmmaker (I, a Woman, Camille 2000, The Lickerish Quartet).
John Phillips, 65, Welsh footballer (Chelsea, national team).
Amy Ridenour, 57, American conservative political activist, cancer.
James Rosenquist, 83, American artist.
Gordon H. Sato, 89, American cell biologist.
Roland W. Schmitt, 93, American technology executive (General Electric) and academic administrator (Rensselaer Polytechnic Institute).
Nigel Sitwell, 81, British conservationist and writer, Alzheimer's disease.
Évelyne Sullerot, 92, French feminist.

References

2017-02
 02